Flavio Insinna (born 3 July 1965) is an Italian actor and television presenter. He is the current host of L'eredità. He is also known for having hosted Affari Tuoi, the Italian version of Deal or No Deal between 2006 and 2008 and then again between 2013 and 2017.

Biography 

In 1986, after trying unsuccessfully to join the Carabinieri (the Italian gendarmerie), he enrolled in Alessandro Fersen's drama school. In 1990, he graduated from the "Laboratorio di esercitazioni sceniche" (Italian for "Laboratory of scenic exercises"), run by Gigi Proietti in Rome.

One of his most popular roles was Flavio Anceschi, a captain in the Carabinieri, which he played for five seasons in the hit television series Don Matteo on RAI with Terence Hill and Nino Frassica. He subsequently starred in two other RAI fictions, Don Bosco and Don Pappagallo (one of the 335 victims of the massacre at the Fosse Ardeatine in March 1944).

In the summer of 2006, Insinna worked in the sitcom Cotti e mangiati (Italian for "Cooked and eaten"). In September of the same year, he made his debut as the host of the prime-time game show Affari Tuoi (Italian version of the American Deal or No Deal) on RaiUno. The broadcast was highly rated and managed to top the competitor in its time slot Striscia la notizia. This gave a rebirth to the popularity of the show, which had had some audience share issues before Insinna. As a result of this success, he received critical acclaim, thanks to which he was awarded a Telegatto on 27 January 2007 for "Best New Personality" of 2006. Again in 2007, Insinna took part as a guest on the final evening of the Sanremo music festival. After two successful seasons, he left Affari Tuoi in June 2008 to devote himself to the theatre.

In 2008, Insinna started playing the title role in the shoes of Commissioner Santamaria Diego in the TV series RAI Ho sposato uno sbirro, a role he kept for two seasons. In 2009, he starred in Many Kisses Later, directed by Fausto Brizzi. In the same year, he also participated as a dancer for a night in the second episode of the fifth edition of the Rai Uno broadcast Ballando con le Stelle. He also read the lyrics of Mango's song Gli amori son finestre for the realisation of the homonymous CD.

In 2011, Insinna hosted the historic broadcast La Corrida (Italian for "The Bullfighting") on Canale 5, personal debut on Mediaset. In May of that year, after the death of his father, he temporarily retired from the scene because he was not up for making people laugh.

Insinna wrote a book, Neanche con un morso all'orecchio (Italian for "Not even with an ear bite"), released on 21 February 2012, which was reprinted four times in a few weeks. In the same year, he hosted Canale 5's Il braccio e la mente (Italian for "The brains and the brawn"). Since 15 September 2012, he hosted the radio broadcast Per favore parlate al conducente (Italian for "Please talk with the driver"), written by Marco Presta and Franco Bertini, aired on Radiodue on Saturdays and Sundays. On 15 December of that year, he returned to host a RAI broadcast on RAI 1, the charity "marathon" Telethon.

On 8 September 2013, Insinna was back to host Affari Tuoi. The broadcast was able to prevail on Striscia la notizia on a daily basis. On 22 November of the same year, he participated as a juror in the TV broadcast Tale e quale show (Italian for "Spitting images show"). On 30 November 2013, Insinna was again a dancer for one night in Ballando con le Stelle, paired with Elena Coniglio: the duo danced a tango that got huge success, leading the jury to award Insinna and Coniglio with the maximum marks (50 points).

In 2018, Insinna started hosting L'eredità on Rai Uno.

Filmography

Films

Television

Theatre 

 1986 Certamen Vaticanum
 1987 Uccidiamo il chiaro di luna
 1988 Folli sempre folli fortissimamente folli
 1990 Il desiderio preso per la coda
 1990 Che tragedia
 1990 Lighea
 1990 Tosca
 1991 Madre coraggio
 1992 Rimozioni forzate
 1992 Il campanile
 1993 A qualcuno piace caldo
 1994 Sotterraneo
 1994 Il tramezzo
 1995 L'inno dell'ultimo anno
 1995 Guardiano di porci
 1995 Radio estetica
 1996 Rassegna di monologhi inediti
 1997 Tunnel
 1997 La banda
 1997 Fegatelli

Awards 

 2001 - Special award: Prima - Italian guide to actors for his part in the film Guardami;
 2004 - award Telegrolla and Premio per l'Europa for his part in the TV series Don Bosco, awarded at the Salerno Film and Fiction festival and Premio internazionale Sant'Antonio for his part as Capitano Anceschi in Don Matteo;
 2006 - Premio internazionale Flaiano, Premio di cultura "Città di Marinella" and Telegrolla for the fictional series La buona battaglia - Don Pietro Pappagallo, Cinema and Theatre award Apoxiomeno filippese for the show Don Matteo;
 2008 - Rome Fiction Festival - Award for best male protagonist for Ho Sposato Uno Sbirro.

Controversy

Neanche con un morso all'orecchio
In his book Neanche con un morso all'orecchio (Italian for "Not even with an ear bite"), released on 21 February 2012, Insinna blamed the nurse that had prevented him from visiting his dying father during the latter's hospitalisation. Actually, the access had been denied as the hospital regulations require a maximum of two people per ICU room, being Insinna's mother and sister were already in the room. In particular, the author included a chapter entitled "L'infermiera stronza" (Italian for "The bitch nurse"), where he wrote:  
Besides, Insinna inserted an unfortunate story about what he would have done to that nurse in the following chapter "Vedrai che andrà tutto bene" (Italian for "It'll be fine"):  Similar words caused huge controversy. During an interview to the weekly magazine Oggi, Insinna fought back stating "I meant every word".
Later in 2017, Striscia la notizia broadcast a TV report about this topic, underlining the violent and misogynistic tone Insinna used in his book, worsened by the fact that the author had certainly pondered those words, talking about "bullying, a violence against women that goes so far as to femicide".

Affari tuoi
In 2017 Striscia la notizia broadcast a TV report aimed at exposing Insinna's duplicity, showing the host talking off the air while recording some episodes of Affari tuoi. Insinna was caught blaming, insulting and offending, directly or indirectly, some of his collaborators and some of the contestants. 
In a leaked tape of 25 September 2014, a fuming Insinna scurrilously complained about the "box X", a special option of the game, which he considered completely useless. 

In a leaked tape of 7 February 2015, Insinna complained about the fact that he had no possibility of choosing the contestants of the episodes. In particular, he was furious at the contestant representing Aosta Valley, Maria Rosaria Seracusa. 

Following this TV report, Insinna generically apologised to the audience for his behaviour, fighting back that the person who had given the recorded files to Striscia la notizia was a betrayer and talking about "TV pornography to attract a little bit more audience".
Seracusa filed a complaint before the police headquarters of Aosta.
After six months, she also stated that neither Insinna nor RAI had apologised directly to her yet.
Co.Ge.Di. International, the society owning Rocchetta, a water brand Insinna was testimonial of, sued the host, asking for more than 2 million Euros for contract violation, as Insinna had behaved contrary to the public morals. The society also fired Insinna, a decision the host appealed but an arbitration panel considered legit.

Prodigi: La musica è vita
On 14 November 2017, after the press conference held in Rome to present the TV broadcast Prodigi: La musica è vita, a night UNICEF was about to organise and Insinna to host, Insinna himself was caught arguing with the TvBlog journalist Massimo Galanto. In particular, the host accused Galanto to have called him "aged" and "recycled". The journalist denied the use of those words and the episode seemed to end that way. A few moments later, a UNICEF representative asked Galanto to shake hands with Insinna as a sign of reconciliation. After an initial resistance, Insinna accepted, commenting: "This is the last time you interview me but it's fine. Great. Oh, think about what you write because I have lawyers ready for everyone. Look, we've greeted definitively, thank you, forever".

L'eredità

Capital of Israel
During the 21 May 2020 episode of L'eredità, Insinna asked the capital of Israel to a contestant. Replying the latter Tel Aviv, Insinna corrected the contestant saying that the right answer was Jerusalem.
The lawyers Fausto Gianelli and Dario Rossi sued RAI on behalf of Associazione Palestinesi in Italia (Association of Palestinians in Italy) and Associazione benefica di solidarietà con il popolo Palestinese (Charity association for solidarity with Palestinian people).
During the 6 June 2020 episode, Insinna tried to take a step back, affirming that "one can unwillingly find himself in the middle of a controversy involving issues a game show shouldn't intervene in" and that "different opinions exist about the topic", specifying that the debated question was to be considered void for the game purposes.
The petitioners complained that there's no debate outside Israel about the fact that most of the international community doesn't consider Jerusalem as the capital of Israel. Consequently, they continued the action before the Court of Rome.
Considering that "it's common knowledge that on 21 December 2017 Italy voted in favour of the United Nations' resolution refusing USA's decision to recognise Jerusalem as the capital of Israel, as well as United Nations themselves repeatedly blamed Israeli occupation of Palestinian territory and East Jerusalem, denying the validity of Israel's decision to turn Jerusalem into their capital", being United Nations' decision directly applicable to Italian legislation, the Court of Rome, Person and Immigration Rights Section, completely agreed with the petitioners with its decision dated 3 August 2020 and registered as RG 31253/2020, forcing RAI to read the following statement during the next episode of L'eredità: "International law doesn't recognise Jerusalem as the capital of the State of Israel".
Notwithstanding, RAI appealed this decision. The Court of Rome, Eighteenth Civil Section, eventually decided that Insinna's rectification of 6 June 2020 was to be considered enough without further clarification with its decision dated 20 October 2020 and registered as RG 40043/2020.

Cavour
During the Christmas 2020 episode of L'eredità, Insinna read the following question: "In 1869, which sentence did Cavour pronounce to inform the Piedmont ambassador that Garibaldi had entered Neaples?" Many people, including Mario Adinolfi, noticed that the question contained a huge mistake, reacting ironically and polemically. Indeed, Cavour had died in 1861, consequently, the timing of the question was completely wrong. The Italian politician did say the line "I maccheroni sono cotti, e noi li mangeremo" (Italian for "Macaroni are ready, and we'll eat them"), the correct answer to the question, on 7 September 1860.
Subsequently, Insinna apologised for that big mistake.

Hunting
During the 27 December 2020 episode of L'eredità, Insinna voiced opposition to hunting after reading a question about that topic. In particular, the host stated that “hunting is not a sport” and that he was “totally against hunting”.
Subsequently, Federcaccia (the Italian Federation of Hunting) reacted by writing a letter of complaint signed by its Director Massimo Buconi to RAI and to the related Parliament Commission, at the same time threatening to sue Insinna for defamation and inviting the audience to stop watching the TV broadcast. 
Social media reaction was in favour of Insinna and people created the hashtag #iostoconflavioinsinna (Italian for “I’m with Flavio Insinna”) to support the host. The ENPA (National Entity for Animal Protection) and Greenpeace also sided with Insinna.

Italian military expenditure
During the 25 March 2022 episode of L'eredità, Insinna blamed the Parliament's decision to increase Italian military expenditure. Taking a cue from the solution to the final game, the word "Risparmio" ("Saving"), the host stated: "Don't get angry, in my opinion saving should concern military expenditure and we should build schools, hospitals, houses with that money". And again: "Tonight's word is Risparmio. In that case, I'm right. Saving must concern weapons."
Many critics followed Insinna's statements. Fratelli d'Italia senator Giovanbattista Fazzolari said: "The overpaid (with public money) TV host Flavio Insinna states he's contrary to military expenditure. Apparently, his jokes are enough to defend Italian borders and freedom in his opinion. Let's start saving his salary first."

References 

1965 births
Living people
Male actors from Rome
Mass media people from Rome
People of Sicilian descent
Italian male film actors
Italian male television actors
Italian male stage actors
Italian television presenters
Italian game show hosts
20th-century Italian male actors
21st-century Italian male actors